"being" is the fifth single by Kotoko under Geneon Entertainment. The title track was used as the second opening theme for the anime series Shakugan no Shana. As of January 2014, this remains Kotoko's most successful single since it peaked at #4 in the Oricon charts and sold a total of 34,736 copies.

Track listing 
being—4:49
Composition: Kotoko
Arrangement: Kazuya Takase
Lyrics: Kotoko
雪華の神話 / Sekka no Shinwa—6:25
Composition: Kazuya Takase
Arrangement: Kazuya Takase
Lyrics: Kotoko
being (Instrumental) -- 4:49
雪華の神話 (Instrumental) / Sekka no Shinwa (Instrumental) -- 6:22

Charts
The song peaked at #4 on the Oricon Japanese charts.

References

2006 singles
2006 songs
Kotoko (singer) songs
Shakugan no Shana songs
Song recordings produced by I've Sound
Songs with lyrics by Kotoko (musician)